GTPase IMAP family member 4 is an enzyme that in humans is encoded by the GIMAP4 gene.

This gene encodes a protein belonging to the GTP-binding superfamily and to the immuno-associated nucleotide (IAN) subfamily of nucleotide-binding proteins. The encoded protein of this gene may be negatively regulated by T-cell acute lymphocytic leukemia 1 (TAL1). In humans, the IAN subfamily genes are located in a cluster at 7q36.1.

References

Further reading